Colby is a village and civil parish in the Eden district of the English county of Cumbria. It is near the village of Bolton to the north and the town of Appleby-in-Westmorland to the east. At the 2001 census the parish had a population of 120, increasing to 129 at the 2011 Census.

Transport 
For transport there is the A66 road and the B6542 road (the old A66) nearby. Colby is next to the River Eden.

Location grid

See also

Listed buildings in Colby, Cumbria

References

External links 

 Cumbria County History Trust: Colby (nb: provisional research only – see Talk page)
 https://web.archive.org/web/20100526230130/http://www.aboutbritain.com/towns/colby.asp

Villages in Cumbria
Civil parishes in Cumbria
Eden District